Eurozine  is a network of European cultural magazines based in Vienna, linking up more than 90 partner journals and just as many associated magazines and institutions from nearly all European countries. Eurozine is also an online magazine which publishes original articles and selected articles from its partner journals with additional translations into one of the major European languages.

By providing a Europe-wide overview of current themes and discussions, Eurozine offers information for an international readership and facilitates communication and exchange between authors and intellectuals from Europe and worldwide. Eurozine is a non-profit institution, its office is based in Vienna and headed by managing director Filip Zielinski. Since November 2018 Réka Kinga Papp is Editor-in-chief.

History
Eurozine emerged from an informal network dating back to 1983. Since that time, editors of various European cultural magazines have met once a year in European cities to exchange ideas and experiences.

In 1995, the meeting took place in Vienna. The success of this meeting, in which numerous eastern European magazines participated for the first time, and the rapid development of the Internet, encouraged the editors to reinforce the existing loose network with a virtual but more systematic one. Eurozine was established in 1998.

Today, Eurozine hosts the "European Meeting of Cultural Journals" each year together with one or more of its partners.

The magazines Kritika & Kontext (Bratislava), Mittelweg 36 (Hamburg), Ord&Bild (Gothenburg), Revista Crítica de Ciências Sociais (Coimbra), Transit - Europäische Revue (Vienna), and Wespennest (Vienna) are Eurozine'''s founders.

 Partner journals (by countries, as of February 2016)''

References

External links 
 

1998 establishments in Austria
Cultural magazines
Magazines established in 1998
Magazines published in Vienna
Magazines published in Europe
Multilingual magazines
Networks
Online literary magazines